Weogufka is a census-designated place and unincorporated community in Coosa County, Alabama, United States. Its population was 207 as of the 2020 census.

Demographics

Weogufka was previously listed on the 1920 U.S. Census as an incorporated community. It did not appear again on the census until 2010 when it became a census-designated place.

Gallery

References

Census-designated places in Coosa County, Alabama
Census-designated places in Alabama
Alabama placenames of Native American origin